Tony Noske is a former Australian motor racing driver and transport company proprietor.

Motor Racing
Having competed in sprintcars, Tony Noske entered four rounds of the 1987 Australian Touring Car Championship with a Perkins Engineering built Holden Commodore VK before contesting the Calder 300, Bathurst 1000 and Calder 500 with Garry Rush co-driving. Noske competed in six rounds of the 1988 Australian Touring Car Championship.

In 1989 he co-drove Ford Sierra RS500s for Mobil 1 Racing, Dick Johnson Racing and Glenn Seton Racing. Having taken on a managerial role with the Mobil 1 Racing team, Noske entered three rounds of the 1990 Australian Touring Car Championship. Noske's son Mark would later become a V8 Supercars driver.

Business
In 1976 Noske established Kalari Transport with three trucks in Portland, Victoria. Having expanded the business to 70 trucks, in 1994 Noske sold the business to Swire. In 2005 Noske re-entered the logistics market establishing Noske Logistics.

References

Australian racing drivers
Australian Touring Car Championship drivers
People from Hamilton, Victoria
1951 births
Living people
Dick Johnson Racing drivers